Mentha alaica is a mint species within the genus Mentha, native to the Pamir-Alay mountain range within Tajikistan and Kyrgyzstan. The species was recorded by Russian botanist Antonina Borissova in 1954.

Taxonomy
While it is accepted as a distinct species by authorities such as Plants of the World Online, some authors have treated Mentha alaica as simply a synonym of Mentha longifolia.

Description
A perennial species, Mentha alaica grows to a height of 1 meter, and propagates via creeping rhizomes. It produces large oblong-lanceate leaves up to 10 centimeters long.

Use
Mentha alaica has been used in various formulations in Traditional Chinese Medicine. As an ingredient within this tradition, it is believed to "dispel pathogenic heat and wind." Under the common name , M. alaica was reported used as an herbal medicine in Brazil to treat nausea, as well as digestive and kidney problems.

Notes

References

 
 
 
 
 
 

alaica
Flora of Tajikistan
Flora of Kyrgyzstan
Plants described in 1954